Philip Parkes (born 14 July 1947) is an English former professional football goalkeeper. He was Wolverhampton Wanderers' first-choice keeper for much of the late 1960s and early 1970s.

Career
Born in West Bromwich, Parkes, nicknamed "Lofty" for his booming kicks upfield, joined Wolves in 1962 straight from school and turned professional two years later. After several years in the reserve league, he made his first-team debut on 19 November 1966, saving a penalty in a 3–2 win over Preston North End. For the following nine seasons, Parkes missed few Wolves games and – over the 1971–72 and 1972–73 seasons – appeared in 127 consecutive league matches, breaking Noel George's club record.

In 1967, Parkes accompanied Wolves as they went to the United States to perform as Los Angeles Wolves in the United Soccer Association, a professional league that imported teams to represent American cities and which, a year later, would merge with a rival league to form the North American Soccer League. Parkes anchored the team as it proceeded to win the USA title, defeating Washington Whips (represented by Aberdeen) in the final. Parkes would return to the United States two years later, in a similar "guest" role, as Wolves represented Kansas City Spurs in the NASL's 1969 "mini-season."

The keeper won a UEFA Cup runners-up medal in 1972, after saving two penalties in the semi-final tie with Ferencváros to help the club to the final. However, he missed out on a winners medal in the League Cup, when he broke an ankle in the run-up to the 1974 final, after having played in all the previous rounds.

He traded the goalkeeper's role with Gary Pierce over the next two seasons, until Pierce made the spot his own as Wolves won the Second Division championship in 1976–77. Nonetheless, Parkes stayed on the books at Molineux until 1978.

With opportunities limited at Wolves, the goalkeeper had returned to North America to play in the North American Soccer League, with the Vancouver Whitecaps in the summers. He served the Canadian club in 1976, 1977 and 1979, the latter seeing him win the Soccer Bowl. He was also voted the league's top goalkeeper for 1977 and 1979, after keeping teammate Bruce Grobbelaar out of the side.

He moved on to the Chicago Sting for 1980 and part of 1981, before joining the San Jose Earthquakes for the remainder of the 1981 season. Parkes left the NASL to help lead the upstart Oklahoma City Slickers of the American Soccer League to the league finals in the 1982 season, but he left the Slickers in the middle of the 1983 season to return to the NASL with the Toronto Blizzard, making just one appearance before retiring from playing.

Parkes also participated in the 1980–81 NASL indoor season, playing half of one match for the Chicago Sting.

References

External links
 NASL stats
 NASL indoor stats

1947 births
Living people
American Soccer League (1933–1983) players
Chicago Sting (NASL) players
English expatriate footballers
English expatriate sportspeople in Canada
English expatriate sportspeople in the United States
English footballers
Expatriate soccer players in Canada
Expatriate soccer players in the United States
Association football goalkeepers
Los Angeles Wolves players
North American Soccer League (1968–1984) indoor players
North American Soccer League (1968–1984) players
Oklahoma City Slickers (ASL) players
Sportspeople from West Bromwich
San Jose Earthquakes (1974–1988) players
English Football League players
Toronto Blizzard (1971–1984) players
United Soccer Association players
Vancouver Whitecaps (1974–1984) players
Wolverhampton Wanderers F.C. players